Wilford Horace Smith (April 1863 - June 9, 1926) was an American lawyer who specialized in constitutional law. He was the first African-American lawyer to win a case before the Supreme Court of the United States, Carter v. Texas.

Historian R. Volney Smith called him "the best lawyer" arguing against southern laws disenfranchising African Americans in the Jim Crow era, "unassuming, ambitious, and brilliant."

Biography
Smith was born in April 1863 in Mississippi. His father was from Virginia and his mother from Kentucky.

He attended Boston University School of Law and graduated in 1883. He married in 1895, and around the same year moved to Galveston, Texas to practice law. He moved to Manhattan, New York City by 1910. He died on June 9, 1926, in Manhattan, New York City.

Writings
Carter v. Texas (1900)
The Negro and the Law (1903)
"Is the Negro Disfranchised?", The Outlook, April 29, 1905, pp. 1047-1048
The Negro's Right to Jury Representation (c. 1909)

References

1863 births
1926 deaths
African-American lawyers
American civil rights activists
Boston University School of Law alumni
19th-century American lawyers
20th-century American lawyers
African-American activists
Activists from Mississippi